Thörnell or Thornell is a Swedish surname that may refer to:

Jack R. Thornell (born 1939), American photographer
John Thornell (athlete) (born 1985), Australian long jumper
John F. Thornell Jr (1921–1998), American United States Air Force officer
Max Thornell (born 1970), Swedish musician
Olof Thörnell (1877–1977), Swedish Army general

Swedish-language surnames